Crest Secondary School is the first Specialised School for Normal Technical (SSNT) students in Singapore.  It commenced its first year of operation in January 2013.

The school engages the Normal Technical students through a curriculum that largely integrates the academic learning often experienced in mainstream schools as well as the vocational training done in Singapore's Institute of Technical Education (ITE).

Unlike the mainstream way of being posted to a shortlisted secondary school by Ministry of Education (MOE) Singapore, students must apply directly to Crest Secondary School after their Primary School Leaving Examination (PSLE).

References

Secondary schools in Singapore
2013 establishments in Singapore